Jeff Jagodzinski (born October 12, 1963) is an American football coach and former player who is the offensive line coach for the Philadelphia Stars of the United States Football League (USFL). He was previously the offensive coordinator at Georgia State University. Jagodzinski served as he head football coach at the Boston College in 2007 and 2008, leading the Eagles to a record of 20–8 and consecutive appearances in the ACC Championship Game. In 2010, he was the head coach of the United Football League's Omaha Nighthawks.

Playing career and family
A graduate of the University of Wisconsin–Whitewater, Jagodzinski played college football there, starting three years at fullback. He was all-conference at West Allis Central High School in Wisconsin.

Coaching career

Early coaching experience
Jagodzinski began his coaching career as the running back coach for the University of Wisconsin–Whitewater in 1985. He was the offensive line coach for Northern Illinois University in 1986. He held a Graduate Assistant position with LSU from 1987 through 1988. In 1989, he became the tight ends/assistant offensive line coach for East Carolina University and remained in that position until 1996. In 1997 and 1998 he served as the offensive coordinator/offensive line coach at Boston College.

NFL experience
Jagodzinski made the transition to the National Football League (NFL) in 1999, becoming the tight ends coach for the Green Bay Packers under head coach Ray Rhodes. Rhodes and most of his staff was fired after that season, but new head coach Mike Sherman kept Jagodzinski until 2003 when he was released. He was quickly picked up by the Atlanta Falcons to be the offensive line coach.

Jagodzinski was hired by Green Bay Packers head coach Mike McCarthy on January 15, 2006 to replace offensive coordinator Tom Rossley. He was the fifth individual to hold the title of Packers offensive coordinator. Jagodzinski joined Paul Roach (1975–76), Lindy Infante (1988–91), Sherman Lewis (1992–99), and Tom Rossley (2000–05). Bob Schnelker (1969–71), John Polonchek (1972–74), Lew Carpenter (1975–79), and Tom Coughlin (1986–87) served as passing game coordinators on staffs that didn't necessarily carry an offensive coordinator.

During his time with the Atlanta Falcons, Jagodzinski learned offensive zone blocking schemes from Alex Gibbs, the architect of successful NFL offensive lines such as the Denver Broncos that won Super Bowl XXXII.

Boston College
Jagodzinski was named head coach at Boston College in January 2007 to replace Tom O'Brien. He inherited a talent laden BC team, which he led to an 11–3 record, a #10 finish in the polls and an ACC Atlantic Division Championship. At one point in the season, the Eagles were ranked second in the Bowl Championship Series standings.  Along with Steve Logan, Jagodzinski brought a high flying offensive attack which was very different from Tom O'Brien's short passing game style. He has been nicknamed "Jags" by BC fans and the media. After his first season at BC, Tom O'Brien protegees Matt Ryan and Gosder Cherilus were selected in the first round of the NFL draft. In the 2008 season BC's record dropped to 9-5, including a loss at the Music City Bowl.

Following the 2008 season, Jagodzinski interviewed for the vacant New York Jets head coaching job, despite being warned not to do so by athletic director Gene DeFilippo. He interviewed for the position, and was fired the next day.  He only completed two years of his five-year contract with Boston College.  The Jets ultimately hired Rex Ryan, who was previously the defensive coordinator and assistant head coach for the Baltimore Ravens.

Tampa Bay
Jagodzinski was hired as the offensive coordinator of the Tampa Bay Buccaneers on January 29, 2009 following the promotion of Raheem Morris, who had been elevated to head coach following Jon Gruden's departure. On September 3, 2009, the day before the team's final preseason game, the Buccaneers announced that they had dismissed Jagodzinski from his role and replaced him with quarterbacks coach Greg Olson.  The firing came due to concerns about Jagodzinski's ability to communicate plays in a timely manner.  He had been asked by the head coach to provide details to the team's offensive play calling, however he was unable to provide familiarity with the Tampa Bay playbook, (deferring to a subordinate to answer questions), thus exposing his over reliance on subordinates.  Morris offered to let him stay on as quarterbacks coach, but Jagodzinski declined.

Omaha Nighthawks
On April 15, 2010, when the United Football League announced the franchise which would be known as the Omaha Nighthawks, Jagodzinski was introduced as the team's first head coach.  He was fired January 3, 2011 after posting a 3–5 record in his lone campaign with the team. The Nighthawks started 3–1, yet finished 0–4 in the final weeks of the 2010 UFL season. He was replaced by Joe Moglia.

Return to college coaching
After serving a season as wide receiver coach at Ave Maria University, he took the position of offensive coordinator at Georgia State University under Trent Miles.

XFL
On May 25, 2019, Bob Stoops hired Jagodzinski to be the offensive line coach for the Dallas Renegades.

On March 9, 2020, Jagodzinski was promoted to offensive coordinator after previous OC Hal Mumme suffered an injury in a collision with a player and accepted an advisor role with the team.

Kentucky
On November 15, 2020 Jagodzinski was hired to coach Kentucky's offensive line for the remainder of the 2020 season after previous offensive line coach John Schlarman passed away.

Head coaching record

College

United Football League

References

1963 births
Living people
American football fullbacks
Atlanta Falcons coaches
Ave Maria Gyrenes football coaches
Boston College Eagles football coaches
Dallas Renegades coaches
East Carolina Pirates football coaches
Georgia State Panthers football coaches
Green Bay Packers coaches
Tampa Bay Buccaneers coaches
LSU Tigers football coaches
National Football League offensive coordinators
Northern Illinois Huskies football coaches
Omaha Nighthawks coaches
United Football League (2009–2012) head coaches
Wisconsin–Whitewater Warhawks football coaches
Wisconsin–Whitewater Warhawks football players
High school football coaches in Tennessee
Sportspeople from Milwaukee
People from West Allis, Wisconsin
Coaches of American football from Wisconsin
Players of American football from Milwaukee
Philadelphia Stars (2022) coaches